Aglossa obliteralis is a species of snout moth in the genus Aglossa. It was described by Turati, in 1930, and is known from Libya.

References

Moths described in 1930
Pyralini
Endemic fauna of Libya
Moths of Africa